The Dollywood Foundation is a non-profit organization founded by Dolly Parton, with headquarters in Sevierville, Tennessee (as of 2022). Shortly after the opening of the Dollywood theme park in 1986, the Dollywood Foundation was created in April 1988, and began by offering scholarships to local high school students.  From there it grew into the Imagination Library, started in 1995, which distributes free books to children monthly, up until the age of 5.  The Dollywood Foundation grew again into the My People Fund, which started in 2016 after wildfires ripped through Tennessee. The current President of the Dollywood Company is Craig Ross. Today, the foundation continues to grant scholarships and awards, and provides support to numerous non-profit organizations that aim to improve the quality of life of children and others in need.

Dolly Parton's Imagination Library 
The Imagination Library is a free children's book gifting program started by Dolly Parton in 1995. It is based at her Dollywood theme park near Pigeon Forge, Tennessee. The program started by offering every child in Sevier County, Tennessee, the area where Parton was born and raised, a free age-appropriate book each month in the mail until the age of five, regardless of family income. In 2000, the Imagination Library became so popular that Dolly announced that she wanted to make the program available to any community that would partner with her and support it locally. The program has since expanded to over 1,800 local communities in the US, Canada, Ireland and the United Kingdom. The program can be implemented in other communities by private or public non-profit organizations, and the Foundation is responsible for the distribution of books in those participating communities and the database that manages the children's information. In 2018, Parton celebrated the delivery of the 100 millionth book since the inception of the program. The Library of Congress hosted an event in February 2018 commemorating the milestone with Parton holding a Story Time to children attending the event. The Imagination Library program currently sends roughly 1.3 million books to children every month. As of 2021, at least 1.7 million children in the U.S. are enrolled, with a net monthly increase of 20,000 to 30,000 children. The program has drastically improved literacy for the children enrolled.

My People Fund 
In November 2016, two teenage boys were charged with setting a fire in the Great Smoky Mountains National Park, known as the 2016 Great Smoky Mountains wildfires, which killed fourteen people, including two children, and burned down thousands of homes and businesses. Charges against the two juvenile suspects were later dropped due to insufficient evidence. Dolly gathered her Dollywood companies (Dolly Parton’s Stampede, Dolly Parton’s Lumberjack Adventure, Pirates Voyage, The Dollywood Company) and to establish the ‘My People Fund’ which ultimately donated $1,000 per month to Sevier County households who lost their homes in the fire. Those collecting charitable donations from the Dollywood Foundation could collect their funds for up to six months. Significant donors to the fund include Verizon, Tanger Outlets, Miley Cyrus’ Happy Hippie Foundation, CoreCivic and The Blalock Company. The My People Fund raised over $9 million and assisted more than 900 families.

Scholarships and awards 
Having graduated from Sevier County High School in 1964, Dolly Parton launched The Dollywood Foundation in 1988 with the initial intention of raising scholarship funds for local high school students. The Dolly Parton Scholarship was first offered in August 2000. The scholarship would grant a total of $15,000 to four students. With further sponsorship, the scholarship was later offered to four additional high schools including Seymour, Pigeon Forge, and Gatlinburg-Pittman.

When the Imagination Library reached its 100-million total book distribution mark, Dolly Parton announced she would be awarding a scholarship to a participant in the library’s program. In November 2016, Parton granted a $30,000 scholarship to a two-year-old girl, one of the library’s newest participants. The little girl was announced as the winner during the Pure & Simple tour stop in Pigeon Forge, Tennessee. The money was placed in an account that will hold the money until the girl enrolls in college. The scholarship, after the 16-year wait, will amount to nearly $50,000.

The Chasing Rainbows Award was created by the National Network of State Teachers of the Year (NNSTOY) in Parton's name. First presented to Dolly in 2002, the award is now given annually to a deserving teacher who has overcome hardship. The Imagination Library has since partnered with the NNSTOY.

Results 
By 2006 the Dollywood Foundation’s Imagination Library had spread to 471 communities in 41 states.  The overall rating of the organization was given 3 out of 4 stars by charity navigator.  The foundation later spread to the United Kingdom, Republic of Ireland, Australia and Canada.  The program helps about 1 million children each month.  It is broken down into 6 groups that give recommendations on books depending on when the child was born.

The foundation also gives out scholarships. On April, 30 1988, Dolly Parton launched the Buddy Program that required a student and one friend to sign a contract agreeing that both pupils must graduate and upon completion each of them would receive $500.  The Buddy Program caused the drop-out rate to go down to 6% and kick started her community into creating initiatives to keep kids in school.  Awards are made in the following areas: music, academics, and the environment.

References

External links
Dollywood Foundation Website
The Imagination Library

Dollywood
Educational foundations in the United States
Non-profit organizations based in Tennessee